Brockhoff Biscuits was an Australian manufacturer of biscuits founded in 1860 by Adolf F. Brockhoff. In 1963 Arnott's Biscuits and the company merged, although they continued to trade under both names for several years until the "Brockhoff" name was completely dropped in the late 1970s.

Products 

 Savoy
 Cheds
 Clix
 Crest
 Chocolate Ripple
 Chocolate Royal
 Golden Cookies
 Gran–O-Meal
 Stirling
 Malt-o-Milk
 Grain-o-Malt
 Crispo
 Edinburgh Shortbread
 Teddy Bears
 Raspberry Shortcake
 Nu–trola
 Tartan Shortbread
 Shapes
 Salada

References 

Australian brands
Food and drink companies established in 1860
Australian companies established in 1860
1963 disestablishments in Australia
1963 mergers and acquisitions